Mikael Fruelund (born February 27, 1980) is a Danish handballer, currently playing for Danish Handball League side Nordsjælland Håndbold. He has previously played for rival league clubs Bjerringbro FH, Viborg HK and GOG Svendborg. He also had a spell at Spanish league side BM Altea.

During his youth career, Fruelund made several appearances for the Danish national youth handball teams.

He is the younger brother of former Danish women international Katrine Fruelund.

External links
   player info

1980 births
Living people
Danish male handball players